Berberis bicolor is a shrub in the Berberidaceae described as a species in 1911. It is endemic to Guizhou Province in China. Its local common name is 二色小檗 (er se xiao bo).

The species is rare and listed as endangered.

References

bicolor
Endemic flora of China
Endangered plants
Plants described in 1911
Taxonomy articles created by Polbot